Hal Smith may refer to:
 
Hal Smith (actor) (1916–1994), American actor and voice actor
Hal Smith (pitcher) (1902–1992), American baseball player
Hal Smith (screenwriter) (1912–1970), American screenwriter
Hal R. Smith (1931–2014), American baseball player
Hal W. Smith (1930–2020), American baseball player
Hal Smith (American football) (born 1935), American football player

See also
Harold Smith (disambiguation)
Harry Smith (disambiguation)
Henry Smith (disambiguation)
Hank Smith (disambiguation)